Ayibatonye Owei was the former Commissioner of Health, Bayelsa State.

Early life and education
Dr. Ayibatonye Owei was born in Lagos on 12 July 1957; a few years before Nigeria gained its Independence. He hails from Sangana, Akassa in Brass LGA of Bayelsa State.
He had his primary education at the Apapa Methodist Primary School, Apapa, Lagos from 1963 to 1970 and secondary education at St Gregory's College, Ikoyi from 1971 to 1975. In 1976, he gained admission to the University of Jos to study Medicine and graduated in 1982. Dr. Ayibatonye Owei, was the class president throughout his medical school. He was the Financial Secretary of the Jos University Medical Students Association from 1978 to 1980.

After his internship at the General Hospital of Port Harcourt (later became the University of Port Harcourt Teaching Hospital), he served in the mandatory Youth Service Scheme in Aguata, Anambra State where he set up the 24hr Emergency service Laboratory and Blood bank in the Niger Diocesan Hospital, Umunze, Aguata.

Academic career
After his National Youth Service in 1984, Dr Ayibatonye Owei started his medical career as a Medical Officer at the General Hospital Brass. He worked through most of the General hospitals in the then Rivers State. He later became the Chief Medical Officer. During this period, he became the Chairman of the Association of Resident Doctors, Rivers State from 1989 to 1993, Vice Chairman of Nigerian Medical Association Rivers State 1994–1995 and Pioneer Chairman of the Nigerian Medical Association, Bayelsa State Chapter, a position he held from 1996 to 2000. He thereafter proceeded for his postgraduate specialist training in Obstetrics and Gynaecology at the University of Heidelberg Women's Hospital (Frauen Klinik), Germany. He obtained the Fellowship of the German Board (Facharzt Obs & Gynae) and European Board & College of Obstetrics and Gynaecology in 2008. He underwent a two-year training at the University of Cape Town Teaching Hospital; Groote Schurr and University of Stellenbosch Teaching Hospital; Tygerberg, South Africa. Where he worked closely with Prof TF Kruger; a famous gynaecologist of “Tygerberg strict criteria” for evaluation of sperm morphology. On return to the Country, he became the consultant obstetrician gynaecologist to her Excellency and Chair of the medical team in Bayelsa State who carried out Pap Smear Screening of over 6000 women against cervical cancer as well as perform free medical interventions to over 10,000 women over a 3-year period.

Business and political career
He ventured into business as the Chairman of Avondale Services and Supplies Ltd and Eti Health and Leisure Companies in South Africa & Nigeria,  a position he held till March 2014. On the 15th of April 2014, he was appointed the Honourable Commissioner of Health, Bayelsa State by Hon. Henry Seriake Dickson. He led to the high powered committee on Ebola, the collaborations between the state ministry of health and donor agencies/multinationals, the revamping of the health sector; schools of nursing/midwifery; the Niger Delta University Teaching Hospital, etc.

Owei is a scholar, administrator, a fellow of the European Board & College of Obstetrics and Gynaecology and a member of the Society of Gynaecology and Obstetrics of Nigeria.

Personal life 
Dr. Ayibatonye Owei is married with four children. His wife is Ngozika Owei and his children are Lily Owei, Pearl Owei, Daisy Owei, and Cassandra Owei.

References

1957 births
Living people
People from Bayelsa State
University of Jos alumni
Nigerian obstetricians
Nigerian gynaecologists
Nigerian healthcare managers